St. Stephen's AME Church is an historic African Methodist Episcopal Church building located at 312 Neil Street in Sandusky, Ohio, in the United States. On October 20, 1982, it was added to the National Register of Historic Places.

Current use
St. Stephen's is still an active AME Church. Its current pastor is the Rev. Barbara J. Huston

See also
 List of Registered Historic Places in Erie County, Ohio

References

External links
 National Register listings for Erie County, Ohio

National Register of Historic Places in Erie County, Ohio
Churches on the National Register of Historic Places in Ohio
African Methodist Episcopal churches in Ohio
Churches in Sandusky, Ohio
Churches in Erie County, Ohio